The Italian Chess Federation (Italian: Federazione Scacchistica Italiana (FSI)) was established in 1920.
The first Italian Chess Championship took place at Viareggio 1921.

The 1998 Championship was held 21–29 November in Saint-Vincent.
The ten-player field had an average Elo rating of 2390.
GM Igor Efimov won the round-robin tournament with 6.5/9, a half point ahead of GM Michele Godena and IM Bruno Belotti.

National Tournaments (unofficial championships)
{| class="sortable wikitable"
! Year !! City !! Winner !! Tournament
|-
|| 1875 || Rome || Pietro Seni || I Torneo Nazionale
|-
|| 1878 || Livorno || Luigi Sprega || II Torneo Nazionale
|-
|| 1881  || Milan || Carlo Salvioli  || III Torneo Nazionale
|-
|| 1883  || Venice ||  Fermo Zannoni ||  IV Torneo Nazionale
|-
|| 1886  || Rome ||   Fermo Zannoni || V Torneo Nazionale
|-
|| 1892  || Turin ||   Vittorio Torre  || VI Torneo Nazionale
|-
|| 1900  || Rome ||   Arturo Reggio  || I Torneo dell'USI
|-
|| 1901  || Venice ||   Arturo Reggio ||  II Torneo dell'USI
|-
|| 1905  || Florence ||   Arturo Reggio ||  III Torneo dell'USI
|-
|| 1906  || Milan ||   Giovanni Martinolich ||  IV Torneo dell'USI
|-
|| 1911  || Rome ||   Matteo Gladig ||  V Torneo dell'USI
|-
|| 1912  || Viareggio ||   Alberto Batori ||  1°Torneo "L'Italia Scacchistica"
|-
|| 1913  || Bologna ||   Arturo Reggio ||  2°Torneo "L'Italia Scacchistica"
|-
|| 1916  || Milan ||   Arturo Reggio ||  1°Torneo Nazionale "Crespi"
|-
|| 1919  || Milan ||   Stefano Rosselli del Turco ||  2°Torneo Nazionale "Crespi"
|-
|| 1920  || Viareggio ||   Stefano Rosselli del Turco ||  3°Torneo "L'Italia Scacchistica"
|-
|| 1922  || Milan ||   Stefano Rosselli del Turco ||  3°Torneo Nazionale "Crespi"
|}

Italian Championships

| valign="top" |
{| class="sortable wikitable"
! # !! Year !! City !! Women's Winner
|-
| 1 || 1938 || Milan || Clarice Benini
|-
| 2 || 1939 || Rome || Clarice Benini
|-
| 3 || 1973 || Coloretta di Zeri || Rita Gramignani
|-
| 4 || 1974 || Coloretta di Zeri || Barbara Pernici
|-
| 5 || 1975 || Valenza Po || Rita Gramignani
|-
| 6 || 1976 || Bari || Rita Gramignani
|-
| 7 || 1977 || Cattolica || Barbara Pernici
|-
| 8 || 1978 || Latina || Barbara Pernici
|-
| 9 || 1979 || Bratto || Barbara Pernici
|-
| 10 || 1980 || Latina || Rita Gramignani
|-
| 11 || 1981 || Amelia || Barbara Pernici
|-
| 12 || 1983 || Turin || Rita Gramignani
|-
| 13 || 1985 || Milan || Gisella Facchini
|-
| 14 || 1987 || Aosta || Rita Gramignani
|-
| 15 || 1988 || Aosta || Ada Paizis
|-
| 16 || 1989 || Aosta || Rita Gramignani
|-
| 17 || 1990 || Aosta || Giuliana Fittante
|-
| 18 || 1991 || Gorgonzola || Rita Gramignani
|-
| 19 || 1992 || Formia || Rita Gramignani
|-
| 20 || 1993 || Formia || Giusy Parrino
|-
| 21 || 1994 || Formia || Alessandra Riegler
|-
| 22 || 1995 || Formia || Alessandra Riegler
|-
| 23 || 1996 || Mantua || Alessandra Riegler
|-
| 24 || 1997 || Porto San Giorgio || Veronika Goi
|-
| 25 || 1998 || Cesenatico || Alessandra Riegler
|-
| 26 || 1999 || Porto San Giorgio || Sonia Sirletti
|-
| 27 || 2000 || Imperia || Giuliana Fittante
|-
| 28 || 2001 || Imperia || Alba Decataldo
|-
| 29 || 2002 || Bratto || Laura Costantini
|-
| 30 || 2003 || Bratto || Maria De Rosa
|-
| 31 || 2004 || Bratto || Maria Santurbano
|-
| 32 || 2005 || Bratto || Eleonora Ambrosi
|-
| 33 || 2006 || Bratto || Roberta Brunello
|-
| 34 || 2007 || Fiuggi || Fiammetta Panella
|-
| 35 || 2008 || Bratto || Marina Brunello
|-
| 36 || 2009 || Bratto || Marianna Chierici
|-
| 37 || 2010 || Bratto || Maria De Rosa
|-
| 38 || 2011 || Montecatini Terme || Roberta Messina
|-
| 39 || 2012 || Acqui Terme || Tea Gueci
|-
| 40 || 2013 || Porto San Giorgio || Maria De Rosa
|-
| 41 || 2014 || Fano || Alessia Santeramo
|-
| 42 || 2015 || Giovinazzo || Daniela Movileanu
|-
| 43 || 2016 || Perugia || Daniela Movileanu
|-
| 44 || 2017 || Cosenza || Olga Zimina
|-
| 45 || 2018 || Salerno || Marina Brunello
|-
| 46 || 2019 || Padova || Elena Sedina
|}
|}

References

List of winners and standings on Italian Chess Federation website: Italian Championship, Italian Women's Championship

 

Chess national championships
Championship
1921 in chess
Recurring sporting events established in 1921
Chess